Chris Mason may refer to:

Chris Mason (artist) (born 1976), Australian artist
 Chris Mason (darts player) (born 1969), English darts player
 Chris Mason (footballer) (born 1986), English footballer
 Chris Mason (ice hockey) (born 1976), Canadian ice hockey player 
 Chris Mason (journalist) (born 1980), English journalist
 Chris Mason (musician), American musician

See also
 Christopher Mason (disambiguation)